High country may refer to:

 High country (New Zealand)
 "High Country", a nickname for parts of western North Carolina in the United States, including the towns of Boone, Blowing Rock, and Banner Elk
 "High Country", a nickname for the Colorado Plateau, including the towns of Flagstaff, Sedona, Prescott, and Payson in northern Arizona
 "High Country", the mountainous part of the Australian Alps lying within the state of Victoria
 "High Country", a colloquial term for parts of the Sierra Nevada above 5,000 feet in elevation
 High Country (film), a 1983 Australian film
 High Country (album), an album by The Sword
 "High Country" (song), a song by The Sword
 A trim level of the Chevrolet Silverado pickup truck